A rotating magnetic field is the resultant magnetic field produced by a system of coils symmetrically placed and supplied with polyphase currents. A rotating magnetic field can be produced by a poly-phase (two or more phases) current or by a single phase current provided that, in the latter case, two field windings are supplied and are so designed that the two resulting magnetic fields generated thereby are out of phase.

Rotating magnetic fields are often utilized for electromechanical applications, such as induction motors, electric generators and induction regulators.

History

In 1824, the French physicist François Arago formulated the existence of rotating magnetic fields using a rotating copper disk and a needle, termed “Arago's rotations.” English experimenters Charles Babbage and John Herschel found they could induce rotation in Arago's copper disk by spinning a horseshoe magnet under it, with English scientist Michael Faraday later attributing the effect to electromagnetic induction. In 1879, English physicist Walter Baily replaced the horseshoe magnets with four electromagnets and, by manually turning switches on and off, demonstrated a primitive induction motor.

The idea of a rotating magnetic field in an AC motor was explored by the Italian physicist and electrical engineer Galileo Ferraris and the Serbian-American inventor and electrical engineer Nikola Tesla. Ferraris wrote about researching the concept and built a working model in 1885. Tesla attempted several (unsuccessful) designs and working models through the early 1880s before building a working prototype in 1887 According to Ferraris principle of rotating magnetic field, Friedrich August Haselwander developed the first AC 3 phase generator in 1887.  In 1888, Ferraris published his research in a paper to the Royal Academy of Sciences in Turin and Tesla obtained a United States patent for his design. Based on the Haselwander generator, Mikhail Dolivo-Dobrovolsky will develop a three-phase generator and motor for the world's first three-phase power plant built in 1891 in Frankfurt, Germany.

Description
The rotating magnetic field is the key principle in the operation of induction machines. The induction motor consists of a stator and rotor. In the stator a group of fixed windings are so arranged that a two phase current, for example, produces a magnetic field which rotates at an angular velocity determined by the frequency of the alternating current. The rotor or armature consists of coils wound in slots, which are short circuited and in which the changing flux generated by the field poles induce a current. The flux generated by the armature current reacts upon the field poles and the armature is set in rotation in a definite direction.

A symmetric rotating magnetic field can be produced with as few as two polar wound coils driven at 90-degree phasing. However, three sets of coils are nearly always used, because it is compatible with a symmetric three-phase AC sine current system. The three coils are driven with each set 120 degrees in phase from the others. For the purpose of this example, the magnetic field is taken to be the linear function of the coil's current.

The result of adding three 120-degree phased sine waves on the axis of the motor is a single rotating vector that always remains constant in magnitude. The rotor has a constant magnetic field. The north pole of the rotor will move toward the south pole of the magnetic field of the stator, and vice versa. This magnetomechanical attraction creates a force that will drive the rotor to follow the rotating magnetic field in a synchronous manner.

A permanent magnet in such a field will rotate so as to maintain its alignment with the external field. This effect was utilized in early alternating-current electric motors.  A rotating magnetic field can be constructed using two orthogonal coils with a 90-degree phase difference in their alternating currents. However, in practice, such a system would be supplied through a three-wire arrangement with unequal currents. This inequality would cause serious problems in the standardization of the conductor size. In order to overcome this, three-phase systems are used in which the three currents are equal in magnitude and have a 120-degree phase difference. Three similar coils having mutual geometrical angles of 120 degrees will create the rotating magnetic field in this case. The ability of the three-phase system to create the rotating field utilized in electric motors is one of the main reasons why three-phase systems dominate the world’s electric power-supply systems.

Rotating magnetic fields are also used in induction motors. Because magnets degrade with time, induction motors use short-circuited rotors (instead of a magnet), which follow the rotating magnetic field of a multicoiled stator. In these motors, the short-circuited turns of the rotor develop eddy currents in the rotating field of the stator, which in turn move the rotor by Lorentz force. These types of motors are not usually synchronous, but instead necessarily involve a degree of 'slip' in order that the current may be produced due to the relative movement of the field and the rotor.

See also

 Dynamo theory
 Halbach array, a magnetic field that rotates spatially
 Linear motor
 Magnetic stirrer
 Shaded-pole motor
 Squirrel cage rotor
 Synchronous motor
 Tesla's Egg of Columbus
 Timeline of motor and engine technology
 War of the currents

References

Further reading

  Beckhard, Arthur J., "Electrical genius Nikola Tesla".  New York, Messner,  1959. LCCN 59007009 /L/AC/r85 (ed. 192 p.; 22 cm.; biography with notes on the inventions of the rotating magnetic field motors for alternating current.)

 Labzovskii, L.N., A.O. Mitrushchenkov, and A.I. Frenkel, "Parity Nonconserving Current in Conductors of Electricity". 6 July 1987. (ed., Shows that the continuous current arises under the influence of the rotating magnetic field.)
 Naval Electrical Engineering Training Series, Module 05 - Introduction to Generators and Motors, Chapter 4 Alternating Current Motors, Rotating magnetic fields (ed. different copy of the NEETS book is available, Add-free version)
 Rotating Magnetic Field, eng.ox.ac.uk
 Tesla's Autobiography, III. My Later Endeavors; The Discovery of the Rotating Magnetic Field
 Nikola Tesla and the electro-magnetic motor, Inventor of the Week Archive.
 Galileo Ferraris: the rotating magnetic field
 Single Phase Induction Motors
 H.Y. Guo, A.L. Hoffman, D. Lotz, S.J. Tobin, W.A. Reass, L.S. Schrank and G.A. Wurden, The Rotating Magnetic Field Oscillator System for Current Drive in the Translation, Confinement and Sustainment Experiment, March 22, 2001.
  Putko, V. F., and  V. S. Sobolev, Effect of a rotating magnetic field on the characteristics of a direct-current plasma generator.

External links 
 Rotating magnetic field: interactive lecture
 Rotating field animation (YouTube video)
 "Rotating magnetic fields". Integrated Publishing.
 "Induction Motor – Rotating Fields".

Patents
 , Tesla, "Electromagnetic motor".
 , Ress, "Particle accelerator".

Electromagnetic components